Bruno Stutz (21 August 1938 – 11 September 2015) was a Swiss clown known for his performances with the Chickys, an act established by his cousin Eugen Altenburger.

References

External links 

Swiss clowns
1938 births
2015 deaths
People from Geneva